James Reel was an American Negro league outfielder in the 1920s.

Reel played for the Toledo Tigers in 1923. In four recorded games, he posted three hits in 14 plate appearances. Reel was also reportedly "a professional singer with a beautiful voice and style that were similar to those of Billy Eckstine."

He later played center field and managed for the Toledo Travelers in the late 1920s and the 400 A.C. club in 1930.

References

External links
 and Seamheads

Year of birth missing
Year of death missing
Place of birth missing
Place of death missing
Toledo Tigers players
Baseball outfielders